Elachista kleini is a moth in the family Elachistidae. It was described by Hans Georg Amsel in 1935. It is found in Palestine. There are also records for Spain, Portugal, former Yugoslavia and European Turkey.

References

Moths described in 1935
kleini
Moths of Europe
Moths of the Middle East